Theodore 'Ted' S. Koffman (born October 28, 1944) is an American politician from Maine. A Democrat from Bar Harbor, Koffman served in the Maine House of Representatives from 2000 to 2008. He was unable to seek re-election in 2008 due to term-limits.  Koffman served as co-chair of the Natural Resources Committee from 2002 to 2008.

Koffman worked as the Director of Government and Community Relations at College of the Atlantic from 1976 to 2008. In 2009, he joined the Maine Audubon Society. He retired from Maine Audubon, May 1, 2014.

Personal
Koffman was born in 1944 in Morristown, New Jersey. He earned an A.A. from Franconia College in 1966 and with a B.A. from Bloomfield College in 1968. He later earned a M.A. from Goddard College.

References

1944 births
Living people
People from Bar Harbor, Maine
People from Morristown, New Jersey
Democratic Party members of the Maine House of Representatives
College of the Atlantic people
Franconia College alumni
Bloomfield College alumni
Goddard College alumni